Iconos (English: Icons) is the eighth Spanish album and tenth studio album by Marc Anthony which covers Latin ballads from the past and is the second Latin pop album by Marc Anthony after Amar Sin Mentiras. The album was first released on May 14, 2010 in Europe through Ariola Records, and May 25 in the US and UK with Sony Latin.

Album information
The album is produced by himself and Julio Reyes. It also features eight cover versions and two previously unreleased songs that were composed by Julio Reyes. The album includes covers by singers José José, Juan Gabriel, Roberto Carlos, La Mafia as well José Luis Perales, singer and composer from the lead single.

The first single released from the album was "Y Cómo Es Él" (What Is He Like?), a song which was first recorded and written by José Luis Perales. It was revealed on April 8, 2010, and released as digital download on April 12, 2010 through Sony Music.

The second single from the album was Abrázame Muy Fuerte (Embrace Me Tightly), a song from Mexican singer Juan Gabriel. This is the second single by Marc Anthony where he covered a song by Juan Gabriel since his cover of Hasta Que Te Conocí.

About the difficulty of singing "El Triste", Anthony stated that "once you start to sing it you realize the magnitude, of that spectacular voice and special phrasing of José José and his incredible way to perform."

Regarding the decision to make a tribute album, Anthony commented that these songs stood through the test of time and "they just don't write songs like this anymore... I wanted to celebrate artists that had the guts at the time to be so daring".

Reception

Jason Birchmeier of Allmusic gave the album a mixed review. While he praised Marc Anthony's vocals and calling the album first-rate, he criticized Anthony for the lack of originality since Amar Sin Mentiras. Regarding the single, "Y Cómo Es Él", Birchmeier noted that Anthony's passion for the album is evident in the single and concluded that "Anthony may not give fans what they want, but at least he gives them quality material".

Track listing

Chart performance

Sales and certifications

Release history

See also
 List of number-one albums of 2010 (Spain)
 List of number-one Billboard Latin Pop Albums of 2010
 List of number-one Billboard Latin Albums from the 2010s

References

Marc Anthony albums
2010 albums
Spanish-language albums
Sony Music Latin albums
Albums produced by Julio Reyes Copello